Ramiz Hasanov Ayvaz oglu (born August 20, 1961) is an Azerbaijani politician who serves as the Chairman of State Committee on Standardization, Metrology and Patents of Azerbaijan Republic.

Early life
Hasanov was born on August 20, 1961 in Marneuli, Georgia. In 1978–1983, he studied at the Moscow State Institute of International Relations. After graduation, he worked at the Ministry of Foreign Trade of Soviet Union until 1990. In 1990–1992, he worked in Foreign Economic Relations Commission at the Cabinet of Ministers of Azerbaijan. From 1993 through 1997, Hasanov worked at Ministry of Economy. In 1997–2004, he was the first deputy chairman of Azərkontrakt state concern.

Political career
In 2004–2005, Hasanov served as the Ambassador of Azerbaijan Republic to Georgia. On December 14, 2005 he was appointed the Chairman of State Committee on Standardization, Metrology and Patents.
Hasanov is fluent in English, Russian, Turkish and Georgian. He's married and has two children.

See also
Cabinet of Azerbaijan

References 

1961 births
Living people
Government ministers of Azerbaijan
Ambassadors of Azerbaijan to Georgia (country)
People from Marneuli
Georgian Azerbaijanis
Ambassadors of Azerbaijan to Spain